Itabira is a Brazilian municipality and a major city in the state of Minas Gerais. The city belongs to the Belo Horizonte metropolitan area mesoregion and to the Itabira microregion.

It is currently the twenty-fourth largest city in the state in terms of population, with 120,904 inhabitants, according to a 2020 IBGE survey. It is known as the "Capital of Poetry", by virtue of being the birthplace of poet Carlos Drummond de Andrade, is part of the Circuit of the Gold and of Estrada Real.

History

The first settlements at the site date to the early eighteenth century, when the village of Itabira do Mato Dentro was founded by bandeirantes seeking gold. Itabira was politically emancipated as a municipality on 9 October 1848, through Provincial Law No. 374.

Geography

It is located in southeast Minas Gerais, 110 kilometers away from the state capital, Belo Horizonte and 845 kilometers away from the federal capital Brasília. The highest point in the city is 1,672 meters above sea level, and is known as Alto da Mutuca. Itabira is an access point for a number of smaller cities, such as Jaboticatubas, Santa Maria de Itabira, Itambé do Mato Dentro and Nova Era. The closest international airport is Tancredo Neves International Airport (Confins) in Belo Horizonte.

Itabira is a regional economic center, and hosts a thriving iron ore extraction operation headed by Companhia Vale do Rio Doce since 1942, when the company was created by President Getúlio Vargas specifically for the mineral exploration of the Rio Doce valley. As of 2017, it is the second largest mining company in the world, and a considerable part of its iron ore output comes from the mines at Itabira. As a result of the decades-old extraction operations, the city faces air pollution problems.

Culture 
In Carlos Drummond de Andrade's poem "Confidência do Itabirano," the speaker remarks:

Notable people from Itabira
 Carlos Drummond de Andrade, poet and writer.
 Ana Beatriz Barros, Brazilian top model.
 Renan Oliveira, Brazilian footballer.
 Didi, former Brazilian footballer.
 Marco Túlio, Brazilian footballer.
 Talmo Oliveira, former  volleyball player.
 Alessandro Vinícius, Brazilian footballer.

Sister cities - twin towns
Itabira has a one sister city:

 Itajubá, Minas Gerais, Brazil

See also

 List of municipalities in Minas Gerais
 Our Lady of the Rosary Cathedral, Itabira

References

Municipalities in Minas Gerais